Rassie is a nickname for:

 Rassie Erasmus (born 1972), South African rugby union coach and former player
 Erasmus Pieterse (born 1983), South African field hockey goalkeeper
 Rassie van der Dussen (born 1989), South African cricketer
 Rassie Jansen van Vuuren (born 1985), South African rugby union player